RNF144A is an E3 ubiquitin ligase belonging to the RING-between RING (RBR) family of ubiquitin ligases, whose specific members have been shown to function as RING-HECT hybrid E3 ligases. RNF144A is most closely related to RNF144B at the protein level, and the two proteins together comprise a subdomain within the RBR family of proteins. The ubiquitin ligase activity of RNF144A catalyzes ubiquitin linkages at the K6-, K11- and K48- positions of ubiquitin in vitro, and is regulated by self-association through its transmembrane domain.

The biological functions of RNF144A is/are relatively unknown beyond its intrinsic enzymatic activity. Somatic mutations of RNF144A have been catalogued in cancer genetic databases in several primary human tumors, including breast, stomach, lymphoma, glioblastoma, uterine and lung cancers. Other members of the RBR family have been associated with neurological and immunological diseases, most notably parkin, HOIL-1L and HOIP(RNF31).

Current known substrates of RNF144A targeted for degradation are proteins involved in DNA repair, heatshock/chaperone function and signalling, consistent with the predominant association of this protein with cancer, and include (DNA-PKcs), PARP1, HSPA2, BMI1, and RAF1.

See also 
RING finger domain

References 

RING finger proteins